The State Register of Heritage Places is maintained by the Heritage Council of Western Australia. , 91 places are heritage-listed in the Town of Mosman Park, of which seven are on the State Register of Heritage Places.

List
The Western Australian State Register of Heritage Places, lists the following seven state registered places within the Town of Mosman Park:

References

Mosman